Uligan or Uligamu (Dhivehi: އުލިގަން) is one of the inhabited islands of Haa Alif Atoll and geographically part of the Ihavandhippolhu Atoll in the Maldives. It is an island-level administrative constituency governed by the Uligan Island Council.

Geography
Uligan is an outpost in the northwest Indian Ocean. It is the final stop most people make on the way from Thailand before they enter the Gulf of Aden or sail directly up the Red Sea.

Demography
Population, Ha.Uligan: Female 266, Male 270, Total 536

Economy
One of the major sources of income for the islanders is by selling souvenirs and ship provisions for passing yachtsmen.

An airport is planned to be built on this island, to serve Haa Alif Atoll.

Energy Production
Maldives made history with the implementation of the world's first hybrid AC Coupled Renewable Energy Micro Grid in Uligan that will help reduce the dependence on fossil fuel and toxic emissions, which in turn will contribute to reduce the effects of climate change.
Hours of Electricity: 24hrs
Generators: 6
Wind Turbines: 24
Solar Panels: 12
Batteries: 120

References

External links
Official Website
Uligan on Isles
Uligan on Google Maps

Islands of the Maldives